The Battle of Domažlice or Battle of Taus or Battle of Tausch was fought on 14 August 1431 as the part of the 5th crusade against Hussites. The crusade was sent to Bohemia after negotiations, held in Pressburg and Cheb, between Hussites and the emperor Sigismund had failed.

Outcome 

The Imperial army was besieging the city of Domažlice since 8 August, when the sight of the approaching and singing Hussite relief army led by Prokop the Bald and hearing their battle hymn "Ktož jsú boží bojovníci" ("Ye Who are Warriors of God"), led to mass panicking among the crusaders, who fled through the Bohemian Forest. The Hussites immediately set after the fleeing Imperial army and annihilated its remnants. Reportedly, 8,000 wagons and all the equipment of the crusaders were captured. The crusader army was accompanied by papal legate Julian Cesarini who escaped, but lost all of his luggage in the retreat, including the secret correspondence and the Papal bull charging him to hire crusaders.

Sources 
 Ich Wolkenstein, by Dieter Kühn; Insel Verlag Frankfurt am Main, 1977

External links
 Bellum.cz – Battle of Domažlice 14 August 1431
The National Monument Domažlice on Czech Wikipedia

1431 in Europe
Domazlice 1431
Domazlice 1431
Conflicts in 1431
Domažlice
Prokop the Great
History of the Plzeň Region